Jaco Webb is a South African rugby footballer who represented his country in rugby league at the 2000 World Cup.

Playing career
Webb played rugby league for the Johannesburg Scorpions and first represented South Africa in 1995 and again in 1997. He again played for the national side in 2000, coming off the bench for one game at the World Cup.

Webb also played rugby union, playing for Pretoria in 1998 and the Falcons in 2001.

References

Living people
South African rugby league players
South Africa national rugby league team players
South African rugby union players
Rugby league second-rows
Rugby union number eights
Year of birth missing (living people)